The  was a Japanese kin group which claimed descent from Minamoto no Mitsumasa, son of Minamoto no Tsunemoto of the Seiwa Genji clan. however it was later discovered to actually be descended from the Taira clan.

History
In the Edo period, the Mizuno clan produced many men who were fudai daimyō serving the Tokugawa shogunate, as well as countless families of hatamoto. Lady Odai, Tokugawa Ieyasu's mother, was the daughter of Mizuno Tadamasa of Kariya Castle.

The late Edo-era political reformer Mizuno Tadakuni was a descendant of this clan.

The clan ruled over the short-lived Ogawa Domain.

References

Further reading
 Bolitho, Harold. (1974). Treasures among Men: The Fudai Daimyo in Tokugawa Japan. New Haven: Yale University Press.

External links
 "Mizuno-shi" on Harimaya.com (14 March 2008)

 
Japanese clans